Nurse Report (German: Krankenschwestern-Report) is a 1972 West German comedy film directed by Walter Boos and starring Doris Arden, Ingrid Steeger and Karin Heske. It was a sex report film produced by Wolf C. Hartwig's Rapid Film, in an attempt to capitalise on the success of the company's hit Schoolgirl Report series.

Cast

References

External links

1970s sex comedy films
German sex comedy films
West German films
Films directed by Walter Boos
Films set in hospitals
Sexploitation films
Constantin Film films
1970s German-language films
1970s German films